KDWG (90.9 FM) is a radio station licensed to serve Dillon, Montana, United States. The station is owned by The University of Montana Western. It is an affiliate of Montana Public Radio.

The station was assigned the KDWG call letters by the Federal Communications Commission on December 4, 2000.

References

External links
mtpr.org
 

DWG
DWG
NPR member stations
Beaverhead County, Montana
Radio stations established in 2000